Radnički Niš is a professional football club, based in Niš, Serbia, founded in 1923.

The greatest success in European competitions was achieved in the 1981–82 season, when they reached the semifinals of UEFA Cup.

Matches

UEFA Cup / UEFA Europa League

Notes
 QR: Qualifying round
 R1: First round
 R2: Second round
 R3: Third round
 QF: Quarter-finals
 SF: Semi-finals

UEFA Europa Conference League

UEFA Intertoto Cup

References

External links
 UEFA website

Radnički Niš
Radnički Niš
Europe